Hedrum is a parish and the site of a historic church in Vestfold county, Norway. Hedrum was annexed by Larvik on January 1, 1988.

History
The parish of Hedrum was established as a municipality on January 1, 1838 (see formannskapsdistrikt). Small parts of Hedrum were transferred to the city of Larvik in 1855, 1875, 1937 and 1948. Border adjustments between Hedrum and the neighboring municipalities Andebu, Tjølling and Siljan also took place. Hedrum was incorporated into the enlarged Larvik municipality on January 1, 1988. Before the merger Hedrum had a population of 10,449.

Hedrum located in Lågendalen, the lower part of the valley that follows the river  Numedalslågen. The valley is relatively flat, dominated by agricultural areas, valleys are wooded hills and go over the mountain peaks up to 500 meters. Among other things, the area is known for potato cultivation and fishing.

Hedrum Church
Hedrum Church (Hedrum Kirke) is a medieval era  church.  It is one of several ancient stone churches within a vicinity which also includes churches at Hem, as well as Efteløt and  Hedenstad in Buskerud.

Hedrum Church was  built of stone around 1100  and has 260 seats. The church celebrated its 950-year anniversary in 2010. The church has a rectangular nave, square choir and apse. Building Archaeological studies show that the apse is added later. The structure was extended by four meters in 1666 . The west part with the portal and door openings are from after the Reformation. Hedrum Church has a number of  tombstones, which cover large parts of the floor of the church. Hedrum Church cemetery is clearly visible from traffic arteries on both sides of Numedalslågen. Some of the graves are believed to pre-date the introduction of Christianity  confirming the supposition that ancient pagan cult sites were chosen as the venue for the earlier churches.

The name
The municipality (originally the parish) was named after the old farm Hedrum (Norse Heiðarheimr), since the first church was built there. The first element is the genitive case of heiðr f 'heath, moor', the last element is heimr.

References

Other sources 
 Ekroll, Øystein; Ladder, Morten; Havran, Jiri;  (2000) Middelalder i Stein  (Volume 1 of the series  Kirker i Norge)  
Nyhus, Per  (1999) Larvik A-Å (Larvik: Østlandsposten)   
Krohn-Holm, Jan W. (1982) Hedrum bygdebok (Larvik: kulturhistorie)

External links 

 Hedrum Church website
 Map of Hedrum  Church

Former municipalities of Norway
Populated places disestablished in 1988
Larvik
1838 establishments in Norway